Juan Nicolás Callejas Arroyo (9 July 1944 – 21 September 2017) was a Mexican politician from the Institutional Revolutionary Party. He has served as Deputy of the LIII, LVIII and LXI Legislatures of the Mexican Congress representing Veracruz. He also served in the LIII and LX Legislatures of the Congress of Veracruz.

References

1944 births
2017 deaths
Politicians from Veracruz
Institutional Revolutionary Party politicians
20th-century Mexican politicians
21st-century Mexican politicians
Deputies of the LXI Legislature of Mexico
Members of the Chamber of Deputies (Mexico) for Veracruz
Members of the Congress of Veracruz